Cachorro Grande (Portuguese for "Big Dog") was a Brazilian rock band from Porto Alegre, Rio Grande do Sul.

In 2003, the music video for "Lunático" was nominated for Best New Artist at the 2003 MTV Video Music Brazil. In 2007 they won the MTV Video Music Brazil for Best Live Performance.

Original bassist Jerônimo "Bocudo" left the band in 2005. He was then replaced by bassist Rodolfo Krieger. In 2018, guitarist Marcelo Gross was replaced by Gustavo X, but soon afterwards rejoined the band for their farewell tour the following year.

Discography

Studio albums 
 (2001) Cachorro Grande
 (2004) As Próximas Horas Serão Muito Boas
 (2005) Pista Livre
 (2007) Todos os Tempos
 (2009) Cinema
 (2011) Baixo Augusta
 (2014) Costa do Marfim
 (2016) Electromod

Live albums 

 (2018) Clássicos

Split albums 

 (2005) Acústico MTV: Bandas Gaúchas
 (2007) Estúdio Coca-Cola

Video albums 

 (2013) Cachorro Grande ao Vivo no Circo Voador

Singles
"Sexperienced"
"De Baixo do Meu Chapéu"
"Lunático"
"Dia Perfeito"
"Hey, Amigo"
"Que Loucura!"
"Você Não Sabe o Que Perdeu"
"Agora Eu Tô Bem Louco"
"Desentoa"
"Bom Brasileiro"
"Sinceramente"
"Velha Amiga"
"Você Me Faz Continuar"
"Conflitos Existenciais"
"Roda-Gigante"
"Dance Agora"
"Difícil de Segurar"
"Por Onde Vou"

Influences 
David Bowie
Jethro Tull
Led Zeppelin
Oasis
Os Mutantes
Supergrass
The Beatles
The Kinks
 The Rolling Stones
 The Who
 The Hives
 AC/DC

Brazilian indie rock groups
Musical groups established in 1999
Musical groups disestablished in 2019
Musical groups from Porto Alegre
1999 establishments in Brazil
2019 disestablishments in Brazil